Smiukampen is a mountain in Sel Municipality in Innlandet county, Norway. The mountain is surrounded by several other notable mountains including Bråkdalsbelgen, Sagtindan, and Indre Bråkdalshøe to the northwest; and Ljosåbelgen, Hoggbeitet, and Smiubelgen to the northeast.

See also
List of mountains of Norway by height

References

Sel
Mountains of Innlandet